103 may refer to:
103 (number), the number
AD 103, a year in the 2nd century AD
103 BC, a year in the 2nd century BC
103 (Tyne Electrical Engineers) Field Squadron, a territorial regiment
103 (Newcastle) Field Squadron, Royal Engineers
103 (Lancashire Artillery Volunteers) Regiment Royal Artillery
103 series Japanese rolling stock
103, a development name for the Tupolev Tu-2

See also
10/3 (disambiguation)
Lawrencium, chemical element with atomic number 103